Aecidium breyniae is a species of fungus in the Pucciniales order. It was described by Syd. and P. Syd in 1907.

References 

Fungal plant pathogens and diseases
Pucciniales
Fungi described in 1907
Taxa named by Paul Sydow
Taxa named by Hans Sydow